The Tobey–Ayer test is used for lateral sinus thrombosis by monitoring cerebrospinal fluid pressure during a lumbar puncture. No increase of cerebrospinal fluid pressure during compression of the internal jugular vein on the affected side, and an exaggerated response on the patent side, is suggestive of lateral sinus thrombosis.

References

Medical tests